Lansky or Lanskaya is a surname. Notable people with the surname include:

Lansky
Aaron Lansky (born 1955), Yiddish book center organizer
Greg Lansky (born 1982), Jewish French adult film producer
Ida Lansky (1910-1997), American photographer
Meyer Lansky (1902-1983), American gangster
Paul Lansky (born 1944), American composer

Lanskaya
Alyona Lanskaya (born 1985), Belarusian singer
Natalia Pushkina-Lanskaya (1812–1863), wife of Russian poet Alexander Pushkin
Yelena Lanskaya, American film director, producer, and editor

Fictional characters
Lightmaster, Comic book villain whose actual name is Dr. Edward Lansky

Polish-language surnames
Jewish surnames